The Presbyterian Church in Korea HapDongBoSu II was result of a split in the Presbyterian Church in Korea HapDongBoSu I. It had participated in the union movement to restore the unity of the Presbyterian Church in Korea (HapDong) but the attempt failed and it became an independent denomination. The HapDongBoSu I is a conservative Calvinist denomination opposed to both the World Council of Churches and the National Council of Churches. It belongs to the larger conservative denominations and runs nine seminaries and ten Bible schools. It has Presbyterian church government, the standards are the Westminster Confession and the Apostles Creed. In 2004, the church had 669,346 members in 1,300 congregations.

References 

Presbyterian denominations in South Korea
Presbyterian denominations in Asia